is a Japanese singer and songwriter. She is from Nishinomiya, Hyōgo Prefecture. Her agency is ENS Entertainment, and her label is unBORDE under Warner Music Japan.

Career 
Aimyon was influenced to become a singer-songwriter in part because of her grandmother, who herself aspired to be a singer or actress, and her father, who worked as an audio engineer; she grew up with music and started writing songs when she was in middle school. 

She began writing lyrics when she was in her second year of middle school, and around the same time, her father gave her an electric guitar; however, it was not the acoustic guitar she wanted, so she quit within a month. When she was in her third year of middle school, an English teacher who was an ALT (Assistant Language Teacher) left her an acoustic guitar when they left Japan. At first, she looked at the instruction book by herself and challenged things that seemed easy, and she covered songs by Yutaka Ozaki and Spitz.

Aimyon began penning songs in her first year of high school. While she was in school, she appeared on a music program that a friend uploaded on YouTube and performed the song in public for the first time. She also made it to the final rounds of an audition that her friends had sent her application to without her knowledge.

After graduating from high school, a YouTube video of one of her performances caught the attention of her first music label, Lastrum Music Entertainment. Therefore, she has not been active on the street or at live houses.

In 2014, Aimyon was introduced by the president of her agency to Ryoma Suzuki, a representative of unBORDE. However, as she wanted to "grow into an artist who will be loved for a long time rather than making a debut in a hurry", it was decided that her first release would be under an indie label as test marketing. Training including performances started. Additionally, produce Junichi Hoshino told her to make 50 songs before officially joining the agency, and she started writing songs. By the time of her debut, she had about 130 demo songs. 

On February 4, 2015, she debuted as a lyricist with "Time goes by" on Johnny's WEST's third single "Zundoko Paradise". She made her indie debut on March 4 with the single "Anata ga Ibōjan aika ~Shine~" (方解剖純愛歌 〜死ね〜), only available at Tower Records. Its extreme lyrics became a hot topic, and although TV and radio stations refrained from broadcasting, it ranked 10 on the Oricon Indies Weekly Chart. On May 20, she released her first indie mini-album tamago, which was her first nationwide distribution release; she released her second mini-album Nikumarekko Yo ni Habakaru later in December.

On February 16, 2016, Aimyon was selected by SPACE SHOWER TV as one of ten new artists expected to break out in the new future and performed at SPACE SHOWER NEW FORCE. On April 10, she had her first live performance in front of 8,000 people at the event "Coca-Cola presents unBORDE 5th Anniversary Fes 2016" commemorating the fifth anniversary of unBORDE. On November 30, she released her major label debut single "Ikite Itanda yona" under unBORDE. The staff at unBORDE unanimously chose this song as her debut single with the theme of a high school girl's suicide. The title song was used as the theme song for the drama Kichijōji dake ga Sumitai Machi Desuka?. Additionally, fans called November 30 "Aimyon Day" and "Iisao Day (Guitar Day)". Aimyon likes November 30 as a fateful day.

On February 4, 2017, Aimyon released her first movie theme song "Bleach" for the movie Renai Kitan Shu. On August 2, she released her third single "Kimi wa Rock wo Kinanai", which won power play/heavy rotation in August on 42 AM/FM radio stations nationwide, setting a record after achieving it after 4 years and 3 months. On September 13, she released her first full-length album Seishun no Excitement which recorded long sales for more than two years on Oricon charts.

In April 2018, she participated in the temporary group Radio Bestsellers singing the campaign song "Bookmark" for the FM802 spring campaign "FM802 X TSUTAYA ACCESS!". On June 22, Aimyon held her first overseas performance with "AIMYON TOUR 2018 - TELEPHONE LOBSTER-ADDITIONAL SHOW 'TAIWAN'" in Taipei, performing "Ikite Itanda yona" due to the popularity of Kichijōji dake ga Sumitai Machi Desuka?. Around one thousand people attended the concert. On August 8, she released her fifth single "Marigold", which recorded 1st on the streaming chart for 20 consecutive weeks. She was in charge of writing and composing the song "Karada no shin kara made moete irunda", one of the double theme songs of the drama Onryou o Agero Tako! Nani Utatteten noga Zenzen Wakaneendayo!! released on October 12. On December 31, she made her first appearance on the 69th edition of NHK's Kōhaku Uta Gassen, performed her song "Marigold". Chief producer Yoshihito Shibuya said that Aimyon was chosen because "[Marigold] is popular in distribution. It's popular with people in their 10s and 20s who are said to be 'digital natives', and this year's activity is remarkable."

On January 25, 2019, Aimyon released the theme song "Ra, no Hanashi" for the feature animation Ashita Sekai ga Owaru to Shitemo (Even if the World Ends Tomorrow). On April 17, she released her seventh single "Harunohi" which was used as the theme song for Crayon Shin-chan: Honeymoon Hurricane ~The Lost Hiroshi~. She wrote and composed "Dare ni datte wake ga aru" (Everybody has a reason) and "Tachimachi arashi" for the movie Sayonara Kuchibiru (Goodbye Lip), which was released on May 31. The song was sung by the guitar duo Harureo, consisting of Nana Komatsu and Mugi Kadowaki, from the movie. From October, she held a hall and arena tour "AIMYON TOUR 2019 -SIXTH SENSE STORY-".

On July 24, 2020, she was in charge of the special program "Aimyon's All Night Nippon" on Nippon Broadcasting System.

On November 15, 2022, it was announced that she would be in charge of the theme song for serial TV novel "Ranman" in the first half of 2023. It was the first time a solo artist had been in charge of the theme song for a serial TV novel, and it had been seven and a half years since a singer who was born after the start of the Heisei era.

Artistry 
Her musical influences include Spitz, Shōgo Hamada, Takuro Yoshida, Eigo Kawashima, Yutaka Ozaki, Flipper's Guitar, Kenji Ozawa, and Ken Hirai among others. She looks up to male singer-songwriters who choose words with opposite sensibility, emphasize lyrics rather than melodies, and prefers artists who are good at metaphorical expressions. She especially likes folk songs. Her first musical goals were similar to those of Kenji Ozawa and Flipper's Guitar.

Aimyon likes how men are desperate for the women they like, and she admires them, so she creates many songs from a male perspective.

She said that after watching the movie Crayon Shin-chan: Fierceness That Invites Storm! The Adult Empire Strikes Back she was drawn to Tower of the Sun, Tarō Okamoto, Takuro Yoshida, and Betsy & Chris. Later, she sympathized with Tarō Okamoto's view of life and made it her goal to sing under the Tower of the Sun.

Aimyon has stated that she has not yet decided on her musicality, what genre her music belongs to, or what kind of music she wants to do. Song production and arrangers expand the image based on lyrics written by Aimyon and the demo song played with guitar. She said that her own music consists of only her guitar and voice, and it would be best if people thought that she played and sang the best, so that is her strength as a singer-songwriter.

Evaluation 
Tomonori Shiba says that "Aimyon is the 'J.GIRL' who inherited Shogo Hamada at the end of the Heisei era, and the legitimate successor of Misu-Chiru and Spitz who has finally appeared." Aimyon has also said that she was the first star to emerge from a streaming service.

Voice actor Wasabi Mizuta has professed to being a fan, and Aimyon has also been spoken highly of by Yurano Ochi of Atarashii Gakko!. Additionally, bassist OKP-STAR, formerly of Aqua Timez, professed to be a big fan, and has been attending live performances.

Personal life 
Her stage name "Aimyon" was originally a nickname given to her by a friend who was the model for the song "○○ちゃん" on her album tamago. She has released her work in Taiwan under the name "愛繆" (Aimio). 

She is the second daughter of six siblings. Both of her parents were 21 when she was born. Her older and younger sisters each have four children, and her grandmother has 28 grandchildren and great-grandchildren.

When she was in middle school, she belonged to the track and field club and served as the deputy director. She hates studying, and has dropped out of high school once. Her favorite food is ikura, and she dislikes fish and mushrooms, the latter of which is the result of choking on it when she was little. Aimyon likes animals, and she said that she used to often visit Ueno Zoo. She cites her father as her ideal type. Aimyon likes watching Doraemon and Castle in the Sky.

Discography

Studio albums

Extended plays

Singles

As lead artist

As featured artist

Promotional singles

Other charted songs

Awards

References
Notes

Sources

External links
Aimyon Official site
Aimyon Warner Music Japan page
Aimyon Lastrum artist page
Aimyon YouTube Channel
Aimyon Egg artist page
Aimyon (@aimyonGtter) Twitter
Aimyon staff (@AimyongStaff) Twitter
Aimyon (@aimyon36) Instagram
Aimyon (aimyong) Facebook
Aimyon (@aimyon) LINE Add Friend
Aimyon (@aimyon_official) TikTok
Aimyon Amazon Music
Aimyon Apple Music
Aimyon LINE MUSIC
Aimyon Spotify
Aimyon YouTube Music

1995 births
Japanese women pop singers
Japanese women rock singers
Japanese women singer-songwriters
Living people
People from Nishinomiya
Musicians from Hyōgo Prefecture
MAMA Award winners
21st-century Japanese women singers
Warner Music Japan artists